Page Peaks is a 10,929-foot-elevation (3,331 meter) mountain summit located in the Sierra Nevada mountain range, in Mono County of northern California, United States. The mountain is set in the Hoover Wilderness on land managed by Humboldt–Toiyabe National Forest. The summit is situated one mile outside the boundary of Yosemite National Park, and less than one mile east of line parent Camiaca Peak. This landform's toponym, which commemorates a miner and prospector named Page, has been officially adopted by the United States Board on Geographic Names.

Climate
Page Peaks is located in an alpine climate zone. Most weather fronts originate in the Pacific Ocean, and travel east toward the Sierra Nevada mountains. As fronts approach, they are forced upward by the peaks  (orographic lift), causing moisture in the form of rain or snowfall to drop onto the range. Precipitation runoff from this mountain drains into East Lake, thence West Fork Green Creek, which is a tributary of the Walker River.

Gallery

References

External links
 Weather forecast: Page Peaks

Mountains of Mono County, California
North American 3000 m summits
Mountains of Northern California
Sierra Nevada (United States)
Humboldt–Toiyabe National Forest